Keiter is a surname. Notable people with the surname include:

Hans Keiter (1910–2005), German handball player
Les Keiter (1919–2009), American sports announcer
Robert Keiter (born 1946), American lawyer

See also
Keiter Mound, Native American mound in Ohio, United States